Fredrika Eleonora von Düben (December 17, 1738 – March 1, 1808) was a Swedish dilettante painter and embroidery artist

Biography

Fredrika Eleonora was born to Baron Joachim von Düben the Younger and Catharina Eleonora Temminck, daughter of Hendrik Temminck. Her father was a nephew of royal favourite Emerentia von Düben (1669–1743) and served as the cabinet secretary of Ulrika Eleonora, Queen of Sweden.  In 1759, she married Count Nils Adam Bielke  (1724-1792), who was previously married to her relative Ulrika Eleonora von Düben (1722–1758).

She was maid of honour to Queen Louisa Ulrika of Prussia from 1757 to 1759 and Chief Court mistress of the Swedish queen dowager in 1771–1782.

She was an honorary member of the Royal Swedish Academy of Arts (1783) after having participated in the art exhibition with an embroidered landscape in white silk.

References

Other Sources
 Fredrika Eleonora von Düben & Wilhelmina Stålberg (1864) Anteckningar om svenska qvinnor (Stockholm: P. G. Berg)
 Lindberg, Anna Lena (1998) Through the Needle's Eye: Embroidered Pictures on the Threshold of Modernity Eighteenth-Century Studies (Johns Hopkins University Press)
 Elgenstierna, Gustaf (1925–36) Den introducerade svenska adelns ättartavlor (Stockholm: Norstedts förlag)
 Dahlberg och Hagström (1953) Svenskt konstlexikon (Malmö; Allhems Förlag)
 Ribbing, Gerd (1958)  Gustav III:s hustru. Sofia Magdalena (Stockholm: Alb. Bonniers Boktryckeri)  
 Norrhem, Svante (2007) Kvinnor vid maktens sida, 1632-1772 (Nordic Academic Press) 
 Von Düben nr 139

1738 births
1808 deaths
Swedish ladies-in-waiting
18th-century Swedish painters
Swedish countesses
Textile artists
18th-century Swedish women artists
19th-century Swedish women artists
Age of Liberty people
19th-century Swedish artists
19th-century women textile artists
19th-century textile artists
18th-century women textile artists
18th-century textile artists
Fredrika Eleonora
Swedish embroiderers